Daniel Seman (born January 1, 1979) is a Czech former professional ice hockey defenceman.

Seman played in the Czech Extraliga for HC Vítkovice Steel, HC Oceláři Třinec and HC Plzeň. He also played with HC Slovan Bratislava in the Slovak Extraliga.

References

External links

1979 births
Living people
HL Anyang players
HC Berkut players
Czech ice hockey defencemen
AZ Havířov players
HC Havířov players
HC Oceláři Třinec players
HK Neman Grodno players
HC Plzeň players
HC Slezan Opava players
HC Slovan Bratislava players
HC Vítkovice players
Czech expatriate ice hockey players in Slovakia
Czech expatriate sportspeople in South Korea
Czech expatriate sportspeople in Belarus
Czech expatriate sportspeople in Ukraine
Expatriate ice hockey players in Belarus
Expatriate ice hockey players in Ukraine
Expatriate ice hockey players in South Korea